Pee-wee's Big Holiday is a 2016 American adventure comedy film directed by John Lee and written by Paul Reubens and Paul Rust. The film stars Reubens as Pee-wee Herman and Joe Manganiello as himself. The film was released on March 18, 2016, on Netflix. It is a stand-alone sequel to Big Top Pee-wee (1988).

Plot
Pee-wee Herman is a resident of the small town of Fairville and works as a fry cook at Dan's Diner, where he is well liked by the locals and revered for his diner cooking.  However, his world is suddenly turned upside down when his band breaks up.  Soon afterwards, he meets and befriends actor Joe Manganiello, who convinces Pee-wee to leave Fairville for the first time in his life to travel to New York City to attend Joe's birthday party.

Shortly after leaving Fairville, Pee-wee encounters three women being chased and, assuming they are innocent women in peril, offers them an escape in his Fiat 600. It turns out that the three women, Pepper, Freckles, and Bella (who coincidentally goes by the nickname "Pee-Wee"), are outlaws who have just robbed a bank. The women steal his Fiat. Pee-wee then gets a car ride from a travelling salesman named Gordon, who visits a creepy snake farm with Pee-Wee in tow, and gives him a disguise kit.

Pee-wee tries to hitch-hike, but nobody stops, so he seeks refuge at a farmhouse owned by Farmer Brown, who lets Pee-wee spend the night. Farmer Brown introduces Pee-wee to his nine daughters, all of whom have a romantic interest in Pee-wee and flirt with him all night long. The next morning, having heard his daughters talk endlessly about Pee-wee, Farmer Brown insists that Pee-wee marry one. During the wedding ceremony, Pee-wee uses the disguise kit to flee the church. He then gets a ride in an RV driven by four hairdressers who are en route to a hairdressing contest. Pee-wee realizes he is still far from New York, but the hair stylists implore him not to give up.

Pee-wee then meets Penny King, an aviator with a flying car, who offers to fly him to New York. The flying car crashes in the wilderness where Pee-wee meets Grizzly Bear Daniels who promises to show Pee-wee the way out of the woods, but instead, takes him to his cave.

Pee-wee flees Grizzly's cave. After wandering lost for a time, he comes upon an Amish community, where he entertains the locals by slowly letting the air out of a balloon, causing it to squeak loudly and shrilly.

Pee-wee discovers that the bank robbers are hiding among the Amish. That night when the women attempt to steal a horse and buggy, Pee-wee persuades them to leave some of their money behind for the Amish citizens to purchase a replacement.

Pee-wee and the women arrive in New York where the three women are arrested for the robbery. After trying pizza for the first time in his life, Pee-wee falls down a well in Central Park just before Joe's birthday party. Joe believes that Pee-wee decided not to come to his party and cannot enjoy himself. In a state of melancholy, Joe turns on the TV to the local news. There is a story about a rescue attempt in progress to get "a boy" out of the well. Joe rushes to the well and assists in the rescue. During the rescue, we see that the entire town of Fairville, Pepper, Freckles, and Bella (while in their prison cell), travelling salesman Gordon, the staff of the snake farm, the hairdressers, Penny King, and Grizzly Bear Daniels (who have found each other and are relaxing in Grizzly's hot tub) are watching the news broadcast (except for Farmer Brown and his daughters and the Amish people), that went national when Joe got involved. When Pee-wee asks Joe, "What about the party?", Joe responds, "Pee-wee, we are the party", and then shows Pee-Wee a miniature version of Fairville he created, reflecting one of Pee-Wee's models he saw earlier.

Pee-Wee returns to his job at Dan's Diner, where he shows the Fairville residents some of the items he acquired during his trip. Joe appears in Fairville to give Pee-Wee a ride on his motorcycle.

Cast

Paul Reubens as Pee-wee Herman
Joe Manganiello as himself
Jessica Pohly as Pepper
Alia Shawkat as Bella
Stephanie Beatriz as Freckles
Brad William Henke as Grizzly Bear Daniels
Hal Landon Jr. as Farmer Brown
Diane Salinger as Penny King
Patrick Egan as Gordon
Tara Buck as Beverly 
Richard Riehle as Dan
Leo Fitzpatrick as Abe
Christopher Heyerdahl as Ezekiel
Charlie Robinson as Police Captain 
Jordan Black as Yul/Party Coordinator
Monica Horan as Ruby
Brian Palermo as Marvin
Josh Meyers as Sylvester
Paul Rust as Ernie
Robert R. Shafer as Construction Worker
Darrin Dewitt Henson as Police Officer 
Frank Collison as Clay
Lynne Marie Stewart as Jimmy
Karen Maruyama as Tourist
Lindsay Hollister as Peggy Brown
Cooper Huckabee as Minister
Darryl Stephens as Rene
Anthony Alabi as Lane
Sonya Eddy as Wanda
David Arquette as DJ
Nicole Sullivan as Shelly
Janina Gavankar as Party Guest
Thea Andrews as herself
John Paragon as Cameraman
Katherine VanderLinden as Emily

Production
Reubens has often talked about the two scripts he has written for future Pee-wee Herman films. Reubens once called his first script The Pee-wee Herman Story, describing it as a black comedy. He has also referred to the script as "dark Pee-wee" or "adult Pee-wee", with the plot involving Pee-wee becoming famous as a singer after making a hit single and moving to Hollywood, where "he does everything wrong and becomes a big jerk". Reubens further explained the script has many "Valley of the Dolls moments". Reubens thought this script would be the first one to start production, but in 2006, Reubens announced he was to start filming his second script in 2007.

The second script, a family friendly adventure, is called Pee-wee's Playhouse: The Movie and is written by Reubens. The script follows Pee-wee and his Playhouse friends on a road-trip adventure, resulting in many of the characters leaving the house for the first time and going out into "Puppetland". All of the original characters of the show, live-action and puppets, are included in Reubens' script. The story happens in a fantasy land that is intended to be reminiscent of H.R. Pufnstuf and The Wonderful Wizard of Oz. In January 2009, Reubens told Gary Panter that the rejected first script of Pee-wee's Big Adventure (which they co-wrote) could be given a movie deal very soon, and that it would be "90 minutes of incredible beauty". In December 2009, while in character, Reubens said this film is "already done, the script is already fully written; it's ready to shoot." Most of the film was intended to take place in Puppetland with some claymation possibly being used for visual effects.

Reubens has said that one of the two films opens in prison. He has also said that using CGI for "updating" the puppets' looks could be an option, but that this all depended upon the budget the films would have. Reubens once mentioned the possibility of doing one of the two as an animated film along the lines of The Polar Express, which used performance capture technology to incorporate the movements of live actors into animated characters. Reubens approached Pee-wee's Big Adventure director Tim Burton with one of the scripts and talked to Johnny Depp about the possibility of having him portray Pee-wee but they both declined any involvement.

In June 2010, it was announced that Paul Reubens was working with Judd Apatow on a new Pee-wee Herman feature film set up at Universal Studios, with Reubens and Paul Rust set to write the script. In an October 2014 interview with Rolling Stone, Reubens gave an update on the status of the film, saying: "It's been months and months of being right on the verge of being announced... I thought something was going to go public yesterday, actually, and that you'd be the first person I'd be talking about this with. But I'm thinking there will be something made public very soon. It's going to get made shortly after the new year. I wish I could tell you about it right now, because... I mean, it's amazing. It's going to be amazing. It think it first got leaked four years ago or so that the movie was going to be made, and ever since then it's just been stalling and stalling. So I'm really ready for this to happen. But I'm not kidding: It's very imminent."

In a November 2014 interview with The A.V. Club, Reubens explained why the film took so long to be made, saying: "I think part of what happened with this project is it got leaked probably a year and a half or two years before we really wanted anyone to know about it. I was doing a Q&A somewhere, and I said I was writing a movie with a guy named Paul Rust, and the next day a journalist called my manager and said, 'Paul Rust is someone very associated with Judd Apatow, can you confirm Judd Apatow is involved in the project?' The whole thing got leaked and we had just started. We didn't have a script yet or anything, so the script took a year and—I don't really know the answer. I think two years of it was like premature information out there, and then the last two years it's just been very, very slow to get the right people involved, and we now have such an amazing company involved, and that's the really big announcement that hasn't been made yet."

On February 24, 2015, Netflix announced the film would be titled Pee-wee's Big Holiday with Apatow and Reubens producing the film, John Lee directing, and Reubens and Paul Rust writing the screenplay. On March 11, 2015, Tara Buck joined the cast of the film. Principal photography began on March 16, 2015. On April 8, 2015, Joe Manganiello joined the cast. On April 19, 2015, Jessica Pohly was cast in the film.

Release
On December 22, 2014, it was announced that the film would premiere exclusively on Netflix. In July 2015, Netflix announced the film would be released in March 2016. The film had its world premiere at South by Southwest on March 17, 2016. The film was released on March 18, 2016, on Netflix.

Reception

Pee-wee's Big Holiday received positive reviews from critics. On Rotten Tomatoes, the film holds an 80% approval rating, based on 46 reviews, with an average rating of 6.86/10. The site's critical consensus reads, "The simple story is a little short on laughs, but there's plenty of sweet wackiness for Pee-wee Herman fans to enjoy." On Metacritic, the film holds a score of 63 out of 100, based on 19 critics, indicating "generally favorable reviews."

Interpretation
Upon its release, various entertainment and culture columnists made particular note of what they perceived as the film's deliberate romantic subtext regarding the relationship depicted between the story’s two leads.

In his review, Forbes film and arts critic David Alm touted the film's premise as a "subversion", writing that "[W]hile the text is pretty straightforward, the subtext is not, and this is no ordinary buddy picture. [...] [Manganiello] is introduced to us not just as a stranger, but as a hunk on a motorcycle, a badass outsider in a tight T-shirt and a pair of aviators who can activate a jukebox with a firm punch. [...] We laugh, but Pee-wee swoons. On one level, they're new besties; on another, they're falling in love."

Slate.com Outward columnist Paul H. Johnson described the dynamic between the two main characters as "sweetly flirtatious", adding that "[W]hile Pee-wee might seem childlike and sexless, his affection for Manganiello can only be called a crush. Pee-wee dreams of jousting with Manganiello using rainbow-colored lances, and they exchange friendship bands at the end of the movie while squeezed together in Manganiello's treehouse. This is what love looks like in Pee-wee's delicate, but deliberate, mode."

BuzzFeed entertainment editor Louis Peitzman lauded the film as a "queer love story", asserting that "[C]ategorizing Pee-wee and Joe as 'just friends' would be, at best, a euphemistic solution to a relationship that's deliberately vague but undeniably queer. [...] Big Holiday is a reminder that you don't have to meet heterocentric expectations: you can ride off on a motorcycle with your arms around Joe Manganiello. […] It's the closest Pee-wee will likely ever get to a gay happily ever after, and for all that the movie holds back, it's remarkably satisfying."

Salon.com and Rolling Stone contributor Nico Lang cited other columnists' interpretation of the film's central storyline while expanding that "[Pee-wee] is simultaneously incredibly gay and not gay at all. And in Big Holiday, the character does something arguably even greater than come out of the closet: He resolves these identity conflicts to find happiness on his own terms. [...] Herman doesn't have to have actual sex with other men to be wonderfully, beautifully queer."

References

External links
 

2010s adventure comedy films
2010s comedy road movies
2016 films
American adventure comedy films
American children's adventure films
American comedy road movies
American sequel films
Amish in films
Apatow Productions films
Films produced by Judd Apatow
Films set in New York City
Films set in Pennsylvania
English-language Netflix original films
Pee-wee Herman
2016 directorial debut films
2016 comedy films
Films about vacationing
Films scored by Mark Mothersbaugh
2010s English-language films
2010s American films